"Joy to the World" is an English Christmas carol. It was written in 1719 by the English minister and hymnwriter Isaac Watts, and its lyrics are a Christian interpretation of Psalm 98 celebrating the birth of Jesus Christ. The carol is usually sung to an 1848 arrangement by the American composer Lowell Mason. 

Since the 20th century, "Joy to the World" has been the most-published Christmas hymn in North America.

History

Origin

"Joy to the World" was written by English minister and hymnist Isaac Watts, based a Christian interpretation of Psalm 98. The song was first published in 1719 in Watts' collection The Psalms of David: Imitated in the language of the New Testament, and applied to the Christian state and worship. The paraphrase is Watts' Christological interpretation. Consequently, he does not emphasize with equal weight the various themes of Psalm 98. In first and second stanzas, Watts writes of heaven and earth rejoicing at the coming of the King. Watts also didn't write this to originally be a Christmas carol, as the lyrics do not reflect the Virgin birth of Jesus, but rather Christ's Second Coming. An interlude that depends more on Watts' interpretation than the psalm text, stanza three speaks of Christ's blessings extending victoriously over the realm of sin. The cheerful repetition of the non-psalm phrase "far as the curse is found" has caused this stanza to be omitted from some hymnals. But the line makes joyful sense when understood from the New Testament eyes through which Watts interprets the psalm. Stanza four celebrates Christ's rule over the nations." The nations are called to celebrate because God's faithfulness to the house of Israel has brought salvation to the world.

Music

Watts's 1719 preface says the verses "are fitted to the Tunes of the Old PSALM-BOOK" and includes the instruction "sing all entitled COMMON METER". In the late 18th century, "Joy to the World" was printed with music several times, but the tunes were unrelated to the one commonly used today.

The tune usually used today is from an 1848 edition by Lowell Mason for The National Psalmist (Boston, 1848). Mason was by that time an accomplished and well-known composer and arranger, having composed tunes such as "Bethany", which was used for the hymn "Nearer, My God, to Thee." Mason's 1848 publication of the current tune was the fourth version to have been published. The first, published in his 1836 book Occasional Psalm and Hymn Tunes, featured the present day tune (in a different arrangement) with the present-day lyrics; the first such publication to do so. The name of this tune was given as "Antioch", and was attributed as being "From Handel". A very similar arrangement of the tune to today's arrangement, and also with the present-day lyrics, was published in Mason's 1839 book The Modern Psalmist. It was also titled "Antioch" and attributed to Handel.

Musically, the first four notes of "Joy to the World" are the same as the first four in the chorus "Lift up your heads" from Handel's Messiah (premiered 1742), and, in the third line, the same as found in another Messiah piece: the arioso, "Comfort ye". Consequently, and with Mason's attribution to Handel, there has long been speculation over how much a part Handel's Messiah had in "Joy to the World". It is known Mason was a great admirer and scholar of Handel's music, and had in fact became president of the Boston Handel and Haydn Society in 1827 and was also an editor for them. However, resemblances between Messiah and "Joy to the World", have been dismissed as 'chance resemblance' by Handel scholars today.

Moreover, several tunes have been found from the early 1830s closely resembling that of "Antioch", the earliest of which was published in 1832 under the title "Comfort" (possibly as a nod to Handel's "Comfort ye"). This would make it at least four years older than Mason's first publication of "Antioch". Other publications from the early 1830s further suggest the tune may have been around for some time before Mason published his arrangement. Thomas Hawkes published the "Comfort" tune in 1833 in his Collection of Tunes. In it, the attribution was given simply as "Author Unknown", suggesting it may have been older. A 1986 article by John Wilson also showed "Antioch"'s close resemblance to an 1833 publication of "Comfort" and its associated Wesley hymn "O Joyful Sound".

A version by the Trinity Choir was very popular in 1911. As of the late 20th century, "Joy to the World" was the most-published Christmas hymn in North America.

Lyrics
"Joy to the World" has four verses, although the third verse is occasionally omitted.

See also
 List of Christmas carols

References

External links
 Free sheet music "Joy to the World" of "Joy to the World" for SATB from Cantorion.org
 "Joy to the World" - Early New England Christmas Carol

Christmas carols
18th-century Christian texts
Hymns by Isaac Watts
British songs
1719 compositions
Songs about Jesus
18th-century hymns
Psalm settings